Steven J. Camp (born April 13, 1955) is an American contemporary Christian music artist and pastor. In the tradition of Martin Luther's Ninety-five Theses, Camp sent out his own 107 theses on Reformation Day (October 31), 1998, calling for a reformation in contemporary Christian music: calling Christian musicians to make direct, uncompromising music that confronts the world with the message of the scriptures.

Biography
Born in Wheaton, Illinois, Camp was raised by Christian parents, and by five years of age he had confessed faith in Jesus. This greatly influenced his desire to serve God through his teenage years. As a young Christian, he created a close bond with legendary Christian singer/songwriter Larry Norman, who gave him advice concerning Camp's own singing and songwriting. In addition, he met the late Keith Green, who encouraged him to make a stronger commitment to Jesus and the ministry of music. Camp was divorced from his first wife prior to 2002. He remarried on June 19, 2009. He is unrelated to Jeremy Camp, a fellow Christian rock musician. Camp is now the senior pastor of The Cross Church in Palm City, Florida.

Career
Camp attended Roosevelt University, where he majored in musical composition and theory. He studied under Ralph Dodds, a protegee of George Gershwin. He also studied business law/music at the College of DuPage. Camp is theologically Reformed, in the tradition of John Owen, Jeremiah Burroughs, Thomas Watson, John F. MacArthur, D.A. Carson, R.C. Sproul and the late Stephen Olford. In the late 1970s, he began a longtime relationship with a then-unknown Rob Frazier, a one-time Petra member, who co-wrote songs for Camp's own albums. Camp was reunited with Frazier on Frazier's 1992 compilation Retrospect, on which Frazier and Camp sang duet vocals for the song "Why, Why Why?" Camp also had a long-term friendship with Scott Wesley Brown, and he played acoustic guitar and sang backups on Brown's 1977 album, I'm Not Religious, I Just Love The Lord, one year before he went on his own. Five of Camp's albums Sayin' It with Love (1978), Start Believin' (1980), For Every Man (1981), Only the Very Best (1983), and It's a Dying World (1984) have never been released on CD.

Musician
Prior to becoming a conference speaker and lecturer, Camp was a popular contemporary Christian music singer-songwriter. In 1977, he signed a recording contract with Myrrh Records, releasing several songs as a solo artist. In 1983, Camp signed a contract with Sparrow Records, with whom he released nine successful albums. On his first album, Fire and Ice, Camp paired up with Michele Pillar to sing "Love's Not A Feeling". In 1989, Camp released his 10th studio album, Justice, on which he recorded a duet with BeBe Winans, entitled "Do You Feel Their Pain?" After Camp's contract with Sparrow ended in 1992, he signed with Warner Alliance, with whom he released 2 albums. On his 1993 release Taking Heaven By Storm, Camp teamed up with veteran keyboardist and songwriter Michael Omartian, and together they produced a series of No. 1 hits in a single year (1994), including a contemporary remake of "The Lord's Prayer". Later that same year, he released a worship-themed project titled Mercy in the Wilderness.

Appearances
Along with other popular contemporary Christian artists of the 1980s, Camp made several front covers of CCM Magazine, World Magazine, and Christianity Today, among many others. At the same time, he also wrote several articles for leading Christian publications, in addition to giving numerous interviews on Christian radio. After recording several albums, Camp began attending Christian conferences and making frequent guest appearances at Christian colleges. In 1996, he was an honorable invitee at the Alliance of Confessing Evangelicals Conference, where the Cambridge Document was drafted. One year later, he appeared at the Summit on Church Music Ministry held at Cedarville College in Ohio, contending for sound Biblical theology in Christian music. In late 1998 Camp was once again in Ohio, this time in Celina at a benefit for Harbor House Maternity Home, a Christian home for pregnant teens. 440 people were present to hear Steve do four songs, including Keith Green's "Asleep in the Light" and Camp's own "He's All You Need." He followed up his first set of songs with an even more passionate exhortation, possibly causing some in attendance to be a bit uncomfortable with Camp's straightforward approach to his messages: they must do everything possible to save the unborn and be seen as proactively pro-life.

Radio show and writing
In the mid-1990s, Camp was a frequent guest on radio stations all across the country. Between 1995 and 1997, he also hosted his own radio talk show, No Compromise with Steve Camp. He also made guest appearances on The Bible Answer Man with Hank Hanegraaff, The Janet Parshall Show, The Dick Staub Show, Prime Time America with Jim Warren, Iron Sharpens Iron, and many more. He is also a well-known writer for the AudienceONE Ministries website. , Camp continues to make numerous guest appearances on other radio shows.

Discography
 Sayin' It with Love (1978, Myrrh)
 Start Believin' (1980, Myrrh)
 For Every Man (1981, Myrrh)
 Only the Very Best (1983, Myrrh)   (compilation album)
 Fire and Ice (1983, Sparrow)
 It's a Dying World (1984, Myrrh)
 Shake Me to Wake Me (1985, Sparrow)
 One on One (1986, Sparrow)
 After God's Own Heart (1987, Sparrow)
 Compact Favorites (1988, Sparrow)   (compilation album)
 Justice (1988, Sparrow)
 Doing My Best (1990, Sparrow)   (compilation album)
 Consider the Cost (1991, Sparrow)
 Doing My Best: Volume 2 (1991, Sparrow)   (compilation album)
 Taking Heaven By Storm (1993, Warner Alliance)
 Mercy in the Wilderness (1994, Warner Alliance) 
 Best of Steve Camp: My Utmost for His Highest (1995, Sparrow)   (compilation album)
 The Steve Camp Collection  (1995, Sparrow)   (compilation album)
 Abandoned to God (1999, Ministry Music\Diamante)
 Desiring God (2002, Audience One\Diamante)
 The Definitive Collection (2007, Word)   (compilation album)

References

External links 
Complete Discography @ Christian Music Archive

1955 births
Living people
American male singers
American Calvinist and Reformed Christians
Calvinist and Reformed writers
Singers from Chicago
American performers of Christian music
Myrrh Records artists
People from Wheaton, Illinois
Roosevelt University alumni